In mathematics, the equioscillation theorem concerns the approximation of continuous functions using polynomials when the merit function is the maximum difference (uniform norm). Its discovery is attributed to Chebyshev.

Statement 
Among all the polynomials of degree , the polynomial  minimizes the uniform norm of the difference  if and only if there are  points  such that  where  is either -1 or +1.

Variants 

Algorithms 
Several minimax approximation algorithms are available, the most common being the Remez algorithm.

References

External links 
 
 The Chebyshev Equioscillation Theorem by Robert Mayans
 The de la Vallée-Poussin alternation theorem at the Encyclopedia of Mathematics
 Approximation theory by Remco Bloemen

Theorems about polynomials
Numerical analysis
Theorems in analysis